Voices in Fun is an album released by The Four Freshmen in 1961 on Capitol Records. It was nominated for a 1961 Grammy Award in the Best Performance by a Vocal Group category.

Track listing

 “I Want to Be Happy” (Vincent Youmans, Irving Caesar)
 “Ole Buttermilk Sky” (Hoagy Carmichael, Jack Brooks)
 “I Can't Give You Anything but Love, Baby” (Jimmy McHugh, Dorothy Fields)
 “You Make Me Feel So Young” (Josef Myrow, Mack Gordon)
 “Save the Bones for Henry Jones” (Danny Barker, Michael Goldsen, Henry Jones)
 “Swinging on a Star” (Jimmy Van Heusen, Johnny Burke)
 “On the Sunny Side of the Street” (Jimmy McHugh, Dorothy Fields)
 “Mañana” (Peggy Lee, Dave Barbour)
 “On the Atchison, Topeka and the Santa Fe” (Harry Warren, Johnny Mercer)
 “Aren't You Glad You're You?” (Jimmy Van Heusen, Johnny Burket)
 “Happy Talk” (Richard Rodgers, Oscar Hammerstein II)
 “Ac-Cent-Tchu-Ate the Positive” (Harold Arlen, Johnny Mercer)

Personnel 
 Bill Comstock – vocals
 Ross Barbour – vocals
 Bob Flanigan – vocals
 Ken Albers – vocals
 Dick Reynolds – vocal arranger
 Billy May Orchestra – conductor, arranger

References

The Four Freshmen albums
1961 albums
Capitol Records albums
Albums arranged by Billy May
Albums conducted by Billy May